Saint John-Lancaster can mean:

Saint John Lancaster (provincial district, 1995-present)
Saint John—Lancaster (federal district, 1966-1976)